The Independent Grassroots Party was a moderate, democratic socialist political third party in the U.S. state of Minnesota created in 1996 to oppose drug prohibition.  The party shared many of the progressive values of the Farmer-Labor Party but with an emphasis on cannabis/hemp legalization issues.

Some political scholars have speculated that Minnesota's marijuana political parties are responsible for the state DFL Party embracing cannabis legalization two decades later.

History

The Youth International Party, formed in 1967 to advance the counterculture of the 1960s, often ran candidates for public office. The Yippie flag is a five-pointed star superimposed with a cannabis leaf. Following the Yippie Party's lead, the Grassroots Party was established in Minnesota, in 1986, as an independent political party that focused on marijuana legalization. 

In 1996, the Minnesota Grassroots Party split, forming the Independent Grassroots party. John Birrenbach was the Independent Grassroots Presidential candidate and George McMahon was the Vice-presidential candidate. Dan Vacek was the Independent Grassroots candidate for United States Representative (Minnesota District 4). In 1998, members of the Independent Grassroots Party established the Legal Marijuana Now political party.

1996 U.S. presidential candidates

Independent Grassroots Party results in presidential elections

1996 results in Minnesota state elections

Results in federal elections

See also
 Cannabis political parties of the United States

References

1986 in cannabis
Cannabis political parties of the United States
Cannabis in Minnesota
Cannabis law reform organizations based in the United States
1986 establishments in Minnesota
Political parties established in 1986
Political parties in Minnesota
Regional and state political parties in the United States
Political parties in the United States